Hatpipliya Assembly constituency is one of the 230 Vidhan Sabha (Legislative Assembly) constituencies of Madhya Pradesh state in central India. It was created in 1976 and is one of the 5 Vidhan Sabha constituencies located in Dewas District and one of the 8 constituencies within Dewas (Lok Sabha constituency). This constituency covers Hatpipliya tehsil and parts of Dewas tehsil, both in Dewas district.

Since November 2020, the Member of the Vidhan Sabha for Hatpipliya is Manoj Choudhary. His term is expected to last until December 2023.

Birth and extent of the constituency 
This constituency was carved out of parts of Bagli and Dewas by the Delimitation of Parliamentary and Assembly Constituencies Order, 1976. The first elections held here, as a separate constituency, were in 1977.

After the last delimitation in 2007, the constituency comprises the following segments:
 Siya, Anandpur Dungria, Khatamba, Singawada, Bairagarh, Dewar, Lohari and Chandana Patwari Circles of Dewas, all within RI (Revenue Inspector) Circle of Dewas tehsil
 Baotha RI Circle of Dewas tehsil
 Hatpipliya-1 RI Circle of Hatpipliya tehsil
 Hatpipliya town.

Members of the Legislative Assembly

Election results

After 2000

2020 Vidhan Sabha by-elections

2018 Vidhan Sabha

2013 Vidhan Sabha

2008 Vidhan Sabha

2003 Vidhan Sabha

Before 2000

1998 Vidhan Sabha

1993 Vidhan Sabha

1990 Vidhan Sabha

1985 Vidhan Sabha

1980 Vidhan Sabha

1977 Vidhan Sabha

See also
 List of constituencies of the Madhya Pradesh Legislative Assembly
 Dewas district

References

Assembly constituencies of Madhya Pradesh
Dewas district
Constituencies established in 1977
1977 establishments in Madhya Pradesh